The Ministry of Foreign Affairs and European Integration is one of the fourteen ministries of the Government of Moldova.

Pre-history 
The ministry was established on 1 February 1944, as the People's Commissariat of Foreign Affairs of the Moldavian SSR. It would later be renamed to the Ministry of Foreign Affairs of the MSSR on 27 March 1946. 

He following have served as the foreign ministers of the Moldavian SSR:
Gherasim Rudi (12 July 1944 – 19 July 1946)
Alexandru Diordiță (23 January 1958 – 15 April 1970)
Petru Pascari (24 April 1970 – 1 August 1976)
Semion Grossu (1 September 1976 – 31 December 1980)
Ion Ustian (31 December 1980-29 December 1981)
Petru Comendant (29 December 1981 – 24 May 1990)

The Council of People's Commissars in subsequent decades, exercised leadership in the MSSR's foreign relations with foreign nations. At the same time, the post of Minister of Foreign Affairs was often concurrent with the post of Chairman of the Council of Ministers (Prime Minister) of the Republic. During its existence, Moldova had representatives only in the Hungarian People's Republic, with the entire apparatus only consisting then of several people. The highest recognition the ministry received was on 23 November 1983, when Foreign Minister Comendant spoke at a meeting of the UN General Assembly. According to the 1978 Soviet Moldovan Constitution, the international rights of the MSSR were reduced in comparison with the amendments of 1944.

Modern ministry 
The ministry was converted into its current form on 31 August 1989. According to Constitution of Moldova (1994), the structure of the Government is determined by organic law. The office of Foreign Minister is one of the most high-profile positions in the Government of Moldova.

Structure 
The following subdivisions are part of the MFAEI:

State Diplomatic Protocol (SDP)
Press Service
European Integration Directorate 
Section for Political Cooperation with the European Union
Section for Economic and Sectoral Cooperation
Regional Cooperation Section
Directorate for Bilateral Cooperation 
Western, Central and South Eastern Europe Section
North and South America Section
Asia, Africa, Middle and Pacific Section
Eastern Europe and Central Asia Section
Economic Diplomacy Service
Multilateral Cooperation Directorate
UN Section and Specialized Agencies Section
NATO Section and Political-Military Cooperation Section
Council of Europe and Human Rights Section
OSCE and International Security Section
Directorate of International Law
Multilateral Treatment Section
Bilateral Section 
Legal Affairs Section
Consular Business Directory
Consular Relations Section
Consular Section
Public Relations Department
Policy Analysis, Monitoring and Evaluation Sectuin
Internal Audit Service
Special Problems Service
Directorate for Institutional Management
Document Management Section and State Diplomatic Archives
Budget and Finance Section
Human Resources Section
Information and Communication Technology Service
Diplomatic Institute

Duties 
 Ensures the sovereign rights of the Republic of Moldova in international relations.
 Promotes Moldova's foreign policy in relations with other states and international organizations.
 Informs the President, Parliament and Government on major international events, and make proposals on Moldova's position towards them.
 Negotiates on behalf of the Republic of Moldova and participate in negotiating treaties and international agreements.
 Directs and controls the activity of diplomatic missions and consular offices of the Republic of Moldova to other countries and international organizations.
 Analyzes internal and external situation of countries with which Moldova has diplomatic relations, identifies and evaluates development opportunities of trade and economic relations with these countries.
 Cooperates with the central specialized bodies and other structures of government in external economic relations and promotion of the state's unified policy externally.

List of ministers

References

External links
Ministry of the Foreign Affairs and European Integration of Moldova
Minister of Foreign Affairs and European Integration

Foreign Affairs and European Integration
Moldova
Moldova